The 2007–08 Iowa Hawkeyes men's basketball team represented the University of Iowa and the Iowa Hawkeyes men's basketball program in the 2007–08 college basketball season.  Coached by Todd Lickliter, they played their home games at Carver-Hawkeye Arena in Iowa City, Iowa.

Personnel

Schedule 

|-
!colspan=8| Exhibition

|-
!colspan=8| Regular season

|-
!colspan=8| Big Ten tournament

References

Iowa Hawkeyes men's basketball seasons
Iowa
Hawk
Hawk